This is a list of cities and towns in Albania categorised by municipality, county and population, according to the criteria used by the Institute of Statistics (INSTAT). As of 2014, there were 74 cities classified as urban areas and 2,972 villages as rural areas in Albania. The legislation of Albania provides no official classification on the criteria of how to define a city or urban area. Furthermore, according to the methodology for cities conducted by the Organisation for Economic Co-operation and Development (OECD), five areas, including Tirana, Durrës, Elbasan, Shkodër and Vlorë, can be classified as urban audit cities.

Cities and towns in Albania belong to the following size ranges in terms of the number of population:
One city larger than 250,000: Tirana
Seven cities from 50,000 to 250,000: Durrës, Fier, Elbasan, Kamëz, Korçë, Shkodër and Vlorë
Four cities from 20,000 to 50,000: Berat, Lushnjë, Pogradec and Kavajë

List

Map

Gallery

Notes

References 

Cities
 
Albania
Albania
Albania